Friedrich Bertram Sixt von Armin (1851 1936), German general in World War I
Hans-Heinrich Sixt von Armin (1890-1952), German lieutenant general in World War II 
Elizabeth von Arnim (1866 1941)

See also
 Armin (disambiguation)